The Todd Agnew discography is about the works of contemporary worship musician Todd Agnew.

Discography

Independent albums
 The Blue CD (1997) - Independent

Studio albums

Live albums

Holiday albums

Singles

Other album appearances
This is the list of his other album appearances.

Open the Eyes of My Heart: Platinum Edition, 2010 .... "Grace Like Rain" (from Grace Like Rain) [INO] 
SongDISCovery Vol. 82, 2009 .... "Gloria" (from Need) [Worship Leader] 
I Can Only Imagine: Platinum Edition, 2008 .... "This Fragile Breath" [Time Life] 
Happy New Year 2008, 2007 .... "Don't Say a Word" [Provident] 
iWorship Platinum: A Total Worship Experience, 2006 .... "My Jesus" (from Reflection Of Something) [Integrity] 
Ultimate Music Makeover: The Songs of Michael W. Smith, 2005 .... "On the Other Side" [Rocketown] 
Bridges: Classic Hymns, Modern Worship, 2005 .... "Saviour Like a Shepherd Lead Us" [Waterfront] 
Here I Am To Worship, Volume 2: The Best of Modern Worship, 2005 .... "Grace Like Rain" (from Grace Like Rain) [Fervent] 
Hear & Now, 2005 .... "Unchanging One" (from Reflection of Something) [Provident] 
Absolute Modern Worship, 2005 .... "Kindness" [Fervent] 
In the Name of Love: Artists United for Africa, 2004 .... "When Love Comes To Town" [Sparrow] 
WOW Hits 2005, 2004 .... "Grace Like Rain" (from Grace Like Rain) [Sparrow] 
Absolute Favorite Christmas, 2004 .... "Bethlehem Dawn" [Fervent] 
Everything Counts: Worship Songs for Radical Living, 2004 .... "This Fragile Breath" (from Grace Like Rain) [Integrity] 
iWorship: Next, 2004 .... "Romans 12:1" (from Grace Like Rain) [Integrity] 
Absolute Smash Hits, 2004 .... "This Fragile Breath" (from Grace Like Rain) [Fervent]

References

Agnew, Todd
Agnew, Todd